Rosa 'Wedding Bells',  (aka KORsteflali ), is a hybrid tea rose  cultivar, bred by Tim Hermann Kordes in Germany in 2011. It won the Portland Gold Medal in 2019.

Description
'Wedding Bells' is a medium, upright, bushy shrub, 3 to 4 ft (90—121 cm) in height with a 3 ft (91 cm) spread. Blooms are large, 4—5 in (10—12 cm) in diameter, with over 40 petals. Buds are long, pointed, and ovoid. Flowers have a very full, high-centered bloom form, with over 40 petals. Blooms are borne mostly solitary, and are medium pink in color. The rose has a moderate, old rose fragrance and semi-glossy, dark green foliage.  'Wedding Bells' blooms in flushes throughout its growing season. It is very disease resistant and is recommended for USDA zone 5a and warmer.

Awards  
 Portland Gold Medal, (2019)

See also
Garden roses
Rose Hall of Fame
List of Award of Garden Merit roses

References

Wedding Bells